Gambusia longispinis, the Cuatrociengas gambusia (also locally called the Guayacon de Cuatro Cienegas), is an endangered species of fish in the family Poeciliidae. It is endemic to Cuatro Ciénegas in Mexico.

References

longispinis
Freshwater fish of Mexico
Taxa named by Wendell L. Minckley
Fish described in 1962
Taxonomy articles created by Polbot